The International Wrestling Federation (IWF, also known as Killer Kowalski's All-Stars) was a professional wrestling promotion that held events in the New England area of the United States from 1979 to 1996, when it was run by Killer Kowalski. The promotion was based in Reading, Massachusetts, with offices in Burlington, Vermont. It operated in conjunction with Kowalski's famed wrestling school in Malden, Massachusetts.

History and overview

Formation
The International Wrestling Federation was formed in 1979 by Killer Kowalski two years after starting his wrestling school, the Killer Kowalski Institute for Professional Wrestling, in Malden, Massachusetts. According to former student John Callahan, Kowalski decided to form his own group after an argument with Angelo Savoldi at the Boston Garden. The first championship titles were introduced in the early 1980s with Kowalski and The Executioners being billed as the first IWF Heavyweight and Tag Team Champions respectively. That same year, the IWF began airing a Sunday morning show, Bedlam from Boston, on the WXNE-TV. During this period, Kowalski partnered with Dominic DeNucci and Bruno Sammartino's "International Wrestling" group based in Pittsburgh, Pennsylvania.

Territorial reach
Kowalski initially promoted shows in the Greater Boston Area but eventually toured throughout the Northeastern United States. IWF event tours also included high school gyms and fairs in cities throughout New England. Some of the promotion's regular towns included Andover, Bellingham, Billerica, Grafton, Middleboro, Norwood, Waltham, and Westford, Massachusetts. Kowalsi was able to promote IWF shows via his weekly column, "Killer's Corner", for the Boston Sunday Herald. The IWF relocated to Burlington, Vermont in the early-1990s but returned to the Boston area by November 2001.

Notable talent
The IWF featured many former World Wide Wrestling Federation stars during its early years including, most notably, Dominic DeNucci, Larry Zbyszko, The Haiti Kid and The Valiant Brothers (Jerry Valiant and Johnny Valiant). Bull Curry was the main "heel" wrestling manager before his death. Zbyszko's infamous WWWF feud with Bruno Sammartino spilled over into the IWF as he battled his former mentor's real-life son Bruno Sammartino Jr. in late 1982. Kowalski continued bringing in talent from the World Wrestling Federation when Vince McMahon Jr. took over his father's promotion in the 1980s.

The promotion showcased a number of wrestlers who were regulars in the northeast wrestling scene and was the birthplace of Paul Levesque (then known as Terra Ryzing), Perry Saturn and Chyna. Levesque, who had graduated from Kowalski's school at the top of his class, made his IWF debut in March 1992 defeating Tony Roy. Two months later, he won the organization's heavyweight title from Mad Dog Richard. Saturn, billed as "The Iron Horseman", won the IWF North American and Light Heavyweight Championship during the early 1990s. He also won the IWF Tag Team Championship with Levesque. Saturn met his future tag team partner John Kronus while working for the IWF and helped enroll him in Kowalski's wrestling school. Brittany Brown was the longest reigning Women’s Champion (12 years), then Chyna (Joanie Lee) won the IWF Ladies Championship from Violet Flame in the very late 1990s. "Giant" Ron Reis and The Renegade, as "Rio, Lord of the Jungle", found success in World Championship Wrestling.

World Wrestling Federation
Kowalski had a strong relationship with both Vince McMahon Sr. and his son Vince McMahon Jr. His students (many of whom IWF stars) regularly appeared on World Wrestling Federation television as preliminary wrestlers during the 1980s and 90s. His best known students - Triple H, Chyna and Perry Saturn - had prominent roles in the company during the Attitude Era.

The IWF later featured former WWF stars Demolition Ax, King Kong Bundy, Hercules, The Honky Tonk Man, The Mountie, Jake "The Snake" Roberts, Jimmy Snuka, and Nikolai Volkoff. In December 1992, following his controversial departure from the WWF, The Ultimate Warrior (appearing under his old "Dingo Warrior" ring name) wrestled Hercules at an IWF show in Billerica, Massachusetts. Then current WWF stars, such as Adam Bomb, Bob Backlund, Doink the Clown, King Kong Bundy and Hakushi, occasionally appeared at IWF events in the mid-1990s.

Demise
The IWF stopped holding regular shows after 1996 though Kowalski continued promoting under the "Killer Kowalski's All-Stars" banner for a few more years. In November 2001, the IWF took part in "Headlocks for Humanity", an American Red Cross benefit show for victims of the September 11th attacks, with Slyk Wagner Brown (managed by April Hunter) and CueBall representing the promotion. One of the IWF's last shows was held in Sutton, New Hampshire on November 2, 2002. Finally in 2003, health issues forced Kowalski to withdraw from both promoting and the wrestling school. Following his death in 2008, the Kowalski estate auctioned off IWF correspondence and other wrestling memorabilia from his career.

Alumni
Male wrestlers

Female wrestlers

Midget wrestlers

Stables and tag teams

Managers and valets

Commentators and interviewers

Referees

Other personnel

Championships
Key

IWF Heavyweight Championship

IWF Tag Team Championship

IWF North American Championship

IWF Light Heavyweight Championship

IWF Ladies Championship

Footnotes

References

Further reading

External links
International Wrestling Federation at Cagematch.net
International Wrestling Federation at Wrestlingdata.com

Entertainment companies established in 1979
Entertainment companies disestablished in 1996
Independent professional wrestling promotions based in Massachusetts
Sports organizations established in 1979
Sports organizations disestablished in 1996